The New Haven Profs was one of the longest lasting names of a minor league baseball team that was located in New Haven, Connecticut and played primarily in the Eastern League and Connecticut League from 1878 to 1932.

External links
Baseball Reference

Professional baseball teams in Connecticut
Defunct Eastern League (1938–present) teams
Defunct Eastern Association teams
Defunct Connecticut State League teams
Defunct Connecticut League teams
Defunct Naugatuck Valley League teams
Defunct Atlantic Association teams
Defunct Atlantic League teams
Defunct Southern New England League teams
Defunct Colonial League teams
Defunct International Association teams
Baseball teams established in 1878
Baseball teams disestablished in 1932
1878 establishments in Connecticut
1932 disestablishments in Connecticut
Sports in New Haven, Connecticut
Defunct baseball teams in Connecticut